Adler was a German automobile and motorcycle manufacturer from 1900 until 1957. The 'Adler'  name is German for 'eagle'.

History
The Adler factory produced bicycles, typewriters, motorcycles and calculators in addition to cars. Before World War I, the company used De Dion two- and four-cylinder engines in cars that ranged from 1032 cc to 9081 cc; beginning in 1902 (the year Edmund Rumpler became technical director), they used their own engines as well. These cars, driven by Erwin Kleyer and Otto Kleyer (sons of the company founder Heinrich Kleyer) and by Alfred Theves won many sporting events. In the 1920s, Karl Irion raced many Adlers; popular models of the period included the 2298 cc, 1550 cc, and 4700 cc four-cylinders and the 2580 cc six-cylinders. A few of the Standard models, built between 1927 and 1934, featured Gropius-designed coachwork. The Adler Standard 6, which entered volume production in 1927, had a 2540 cc or 2916 cc six-cylinder engine, while the Adler Standard 8 which appeared a year later use a 3887 cc eight-cylinder engine.  The Standard 6, first seen in public at the Berlin Motor Show in October 1926 was the first Continental European car to use Lockheed hydraulic brakes (the Triumph 13/35 offered them in the UK in 1924 and Duesenberg offered them in the US in 1920), when it was fitted with an ATE-Lockheed system. 1927 to 1929 Clärenore Stinnes was the first to circumnavigate the world by car, in an Adler Standard 6.

In December 1930, Adler assigned the German engineer Josef Ganz, who was also editor-in-chief of Motor-Kritik magazine, as a consultant engineer. In the first months of 1931, Ganz constructed a lightweight Volkswagen prototype at Adler with a tubular chassis, a mid-mounted engine, and independent wheel suspension with swing-axles at the rear. After completion in May 1931, Ganz nicknamed his new prototype Maikäfer (May Beetle). After a shift in management at Adler, further development of the Maikäfer was stopped as the company's new technical director Hans Gustav Röhr concentrated on front-wheel driven cars.

In the 1930s, the company introduced front-wheel drive Trumpf and Trumpf-Junior models, ranging from 995 cc to 1645 cc four-cylinder flat-head sv engines. These gained many successes in races, including in the Le Mans race. The 1943 cc Favorit, the 2916 cc six-cylinder Diplomat (featuring 65 hp (48 kW) at 3800 rpm, and the 1910 cc four-cylinder and 2494 cc six-cylinder models (with Ambi-Budd and Karmann bodywork) were all rear-driven; these were built until World War II. The last new car introduced by Adler was the 2.5 Liter of 1937; it had a six-cylinder engine producing 58 hp (43 kW). Thanks to a streamlined body designed by Paul Jaray, this car could run at 125 km/h (78 mph).

After World War II, a decision was made to not resume automobile construction. Motorcycle production resumed in 1949 and continued for eight years, leading to the production of the MB 250S. As part of war reparations to the Allies, Adler motorcycle designs were ceded to  Britain; however it is an urban myth that the Adler designs formed the basis of Ariel's Arrow and Leader models. Increasingly, Adler focused on the manufacture of office equipment. The company associated with Triumph to form , and was taken over by Grundig in 1957, then later by Olivetti. In 1993, Olivetti sold Adlerwerke AG, which is still listed on the stock exchange, with the entire historical factory premises in Frankfurt to real estate investor Roland Ernst and construction company Philipp Holzmann. The existing typewriter production was initially relocated and finally discontinued in 1998; the site with the listed buildings was sold separately to subsidiaries of the investors. In 1999 HBAG Real Estate (formerly Kühltransit AG) took over 98.3 percent of the shares of Adlerwerke AG from the financially troubled Philipp Holzmann AG.

Adlerwerke AG changed its name to Adler Real Estate in 2002 and have been active in real estate project development since then.

Car models

Galleries

Adler automobiles

Adler motorcycles

See also
 Adlerwerke vorm. Heinrich Kleyer

References

External links

 Adler-Motor-Veteranen-Club (club for owners of Adler cars & motorcycles, website in German)
 Website for Adler motorcycle enthusiasts in Australia
 Website for Adler motorcycle enthusiasts in the UK
 History of Adler trucks
 

 
1957 disestablishments in Germany
Adler (automobile)
Cycle manufacturers of Germany
Defunct motor vehicle manufacturers of Germany
German companies established in 1900
Luxury motor vehicle manufacturers
Motorcycle manufacturers of Germany
Vehicle manufacturing companies disestablished in 1957
Vehicle manufacturing companies established in 1900
Vintage vehicles